AFRY AB (publ) is a Swedish-Finnish supplier of engineering, design, and advisory services, with a global reach. The company originates from Sweden and it was formed in 1895 under the name of “The Southern Swedish Steam Generator Association” (in Swedish: Södra Sveriges Ångpanneförening). AFRY has today 17,000 experts in infrastructure, industry, energy and digitalisation all around the world.

History 
Södra Sveriges Ångpanneförening ("The Southern Swedish Steam Generator Association") was founded in Malmö on 23 February 1895. It was the first Swedish steam-pipe association to take care of the interests of the owners of steam generators and other pressure vessels. The main task was to perform regular inspections on the safety of steam boilers to help prevent industrial accidents."The Central and Northern Swedish Steam Generator Association" was formed in Stockholm in 1897, and the inspectors began to conduct consultancy services. In 1910, both associations expanded their business to include Electrical engineering. The two associations merged in 1964 under the name Ångpanneföreningen (ÅF), covering the whole of Sweden as a market.

On 5 May 2008, the Ångpanneföreningen changed its name to ÅF. In 2010, the operations of ÅF-Kontroll were sold to DEKRA in a step to realign ÅF as Europe's leading engineering and consulting company. In 2019, ÅF acquires the Finnish company Pöyry PLC and are now one combined company and brand– AFRY. On December 10, 2018, ÅF and Pöyry announced a merger to form a leading European engineering and consulting services company. In 2020, AFRY celebrated 125 years as a company.

Divisions 
The AFRY Group is divided into six divisions:
 AFRY Energy
 AFRY Industrial and Digital Solutions 
 AFRY Infrastructure 
 AFRY Process Industries
 AFRY Management Consulting
 AFRY X(2021)

CEOs 
 1 April 2017–present: Jonas Gustavsson.
 2002–30 March 2017: Jonas Wiström.

Major Projects 
 The world's longest traffic tunnel, the Gotthard Base Tunnel in Switzerland
 The world's largest combined power and desalination plant, Ras al-Khair in Saudi Arabia
 The first hydropower dam on the lower Mekong river, the Xayaburi Dam in Laos
 The largest and most energy efficient waste-to-energy plant in Finland, Vantaa Energy, Finland
 One of the world's most advanced sewage systems, Emscher, Germany
 One of the world's largest offshore wind farms, Lillgrund Wind Farm, Sweden
 One of the largest single operating solar power plants in Vietnam, Southeast Asia
 The East Link high speed rail project in Sweden.

External links 
Official website

References 

International engineering consulting firms
Companies based in Solna Municipality
Consulting firms established in 1895
Companies listed on Nasdaq Stockholm
Technology companies established in 1895
Swedish companies established in 1895
Engineering consulting firms of Sweden